Kingswood, Kentucky  is a town in Breckinridge County, Kentucky. It was settled in 1906 and was named in honor of Kingswood School in Great Britain, which was founded by John Wesley in 1748. Kingswood College founded by John Wesley Hughes operated in the community from 1906 to 1934.  A post office was opened in 1907.

References

External links
Kingswood Populated Place Profile

Unincorporated communities in Breckinridge County, Kentucky
Unincorporated communities in Kentucky